Cédric Desbrosse (born 9 November 1971) is a retired French rugby player.

His usual positions was centre. He played for Stade Toulousain where he won top 14 and the Heineken Cup. He was selected for the 1999 Rugby World Cup and he made his first international test debut on 8 October 1999 against Namibia. Whilst at Toulouse he helped them win the Heineken Cup as a replacement in 2003.

Honour
Stade Toulousain
Heineken Cup (2003)
Top 14 (2008 and 2001)

References

External links
 
 

Living people
French rugby union players
Lyon OU players
Stade Toulousain players
France international rugby union players
1971 births
US Carcassonne players
Rugby union centres
People from Givors
Sportspeople from Lyon Metropolis